The Måna or Måne is a river in Tinn in Vestfold og Telemark, Norway; it flows from Møsvatn through Vestfjorddalen and Rjukan to Vestfjorden in Lake Tinn. It is part of the Skiensvassdraget drainage basin.

The river has several power stations, Vemork and Såheim being the largest. It also feeds to Rjukan Falls, that is released once a year.

Rivers of Vestfold og Telemark
Tinn